Lutilodix imitratrix is a species of air-breathing land snail or semislug, terrestrial pulmonate gastropod mollusk in the family Helicarionidae. This species is endemic to Norfolk Island.

It is the type species of the genus Lutilodix.

References

Further reading

Gastropods of Norfolk Island
Imitratrix
Endangered fauna of Australia
Gastropods described in 1900
Taxonomy articles created by Polbot